Baabda District (transliteration: Qada' Baabda), sometimes spelled B'abda, is a district (qadaa) of Mount Lebanon Governorate, Lebanon, to the south and east of the Lebanon's capital Beirut. The region is also popularly known as "Southern Matn District" (transliteration: al-Matn al-Janoubi), as distinct from Northern Matn District, (transliteration: al-Matn ash-Shimali). The capital of Baabda District is the city of Baabda.

Demographics
The inhabitants of the Baabda district are mainly Maronite Catholics, Shi'a Muslims and Druze. The Maronites are the largest group, followed by Shia and Druze. However, Sunni Muslims, Melkite Catholics and Eastern Orthodox Christians also inhabit the area.
It is important to note that Shiite Muslims in the Baabda district mostly inhabit the coastal area of the district which lies directly south of Beirut. This area is also known as "Dahieh" or the southern suburbs of Beirut. The Druze on the other hand, live in the mountainous area further inland.

As of the 2005 elections, Baabda has six seats allocated to it in the Lebanese Parliament. Three of these seats are allocated to Maronite Catholics, while two are allocated to the Shi'a Muslims and one to the Druze.

Environment and archaeology
Baabda District is the source of amber sites dating from 120 million years ago that have uncovered among the oldest lizards including the Baabdasaurus, and also many insects.

Cities and towns
Abadieh
Ain el Remmaneh
Araya
Arbiniyeh
Baabda
Baalchmay
Betchay
Bmariam
Btekhnay
Borj Al Barajneh
Chebanieh
Chiyah
Falougha
Jouar el-Haouz
Furn el Chebbak
Ghobeiry
Hadath
Hammana
Haret Hreik
Haret el Sitt
Hazmieh
Hlaliyeh
Jamhour
Kfarshima
Kfar Selouane
Khraybeh
Knaisseh
Kortada
Krayyeh
Ksaibe
Laylakeh
Qalaa
Qarnayel
Ras el-Matn
Sebnay
Tarchich
Tohwita
Wadi Chahrour
Yarze
Qoubbei

References
Lizard in Amber
Insects in Amber

 
Districts of Lebanon